Dizziness is a 1946 Mexican drama film directed by Antonio Momplet, starring María Félix, Emilio Tuero and Lilia Michel. It tells the story of a love triangle where a young widowed mother finds herself attracted to her daughter's fiancé. The film is based on the 1926 novel Alberte by Pierre Benoit.

Plot
Mercedes Mallea (María Félix) is a woman who married when she was almost a child, and became widowed while she was still young and attractive. Despite her youth, Mercedes decides to spend a lonely life on her ranch, while her daughter Gabriela (Lilia Michel) leaves to study abroad. Years later, Gabriela returns home to introduce her mother to Arturo (Emilio Tuero), her future husband. Conflict breaks out when a deep and dangerous attraction begins to emerge between Mercedes and Arturo. After seeing the pain she is causing to her daughter, Mercedes tries to reject Arturo, but the love triangle ends in tragedy.

Cast
 María Félix as Mercedes Mallea
 Emilio Tuero as Arturo
 Lilia Michel as Gabriela
 Julio Villarreal as Don Agustín
 Emma Roldán as Nana Joaquina
 Manuel Noriega as Santos
 Jorge Mondragón as Miguel Mendoza
 Rosa Castro as Augusta
 Arturo Soto Rangel as Padre Moncada
 Eduardo Arozamena as Don José María

Production
According to María Félix in her autobiography Todas mis guerras, the script was originally written for Dolores del Río, but by a mistake of a messenger it was brought to Félix. On the contrary, the script for La selva de fuego (written for Félix), came into the hands of Del Río, who starred in the film.

Awards
It received the 1947 Ariel Awards for Best Supporting Actress (Lilia Michel) and Best Special Effects, and was nominated for Best Actress in a Minor Role (Emma Roldán), Best Production Design and Best Costume Design.

References

External links

1946 drama films
1946 films
Films based on French novels
Films based on works by Pierre Benoit
Films directed by Antonio Momplet
Mexican drama films
1940s Spanish-language films
Mexican black-and-white films
1940s Mexican films